Rejection is a Ukrainian apocalyptic film directed by Vladimir Lert (ru) with Sergei Babkin (ru) and Aleksandr Bashirov. It was made in 2009, but not released until 2011 in Ukrainian. It was shown in Russian (as Отторжение) at the Ranok film festival in April 2012, and in Russian with English subtitles released on Amazon Prime.

References

2009 films
Ukrainian drama films